Spot-On models, was a brand name for a line of diecast toy cars made by Tri-ang from 1959 through about 1967. They were manufactured in 1:42 scale in Belfast, Northern Ireland, of the United Kingdom. Competition for Spot-On in the British Isles were Corgi Toys and Dinky Toys. The line was particularly British and rarely produced marques from other countries.

A Tri-Ang product
Spot-On models was a range of diecast vehicles from Tri-ang, a division of Lines Brothers, which had been established as a toy maker in 1935. The Lines Brothers made just about everything toy related, from push-along and rocking horses in the first decades of the 1900s to their main staple of trains. After World War II, Lines Brothers claimed to be the largest toy maker in the world.

In the 1950s, Dinky Toys from Liverpool, had developed a successful range of vehicles to be purchased apart from railroad sets and then in 1956 Corgi Toys, made by Mettoy, followed suit. Not wishing to miss out on a commercial opportunity, Lines Brothers started its own range in 1959 – made in its factory in Northern Ireland. Murray Lines himself chose a uniquely British model selection.

The factory had been built in the Castlereagh area of Belfast just after World War II when the Lines Brothers expanded (another factory in southern Wales was opened at the same time). At various times, the Northern Ireland factory produced several ranges of toys for various names within the Lines Brothers' group, including Pedigree Soft Toys Ltd., Rovex Industries Ltd. and Lines Brothers (Ireland) Ltd. About 1960, a smaller factory was opened on the grounds of the Belfast site – specifically for the Spot-On range. There were three main product ranges: Spot-On cars, Spot-On doll house furniture, and Arkitex construction kits.

A definitive history of all Spot-On products was published in October 2013. "The Ultimate Book of Spot-On Models Ltd" by Brian Salter (with Nigel Lee and Graham Thompson) is a 500-page large format book containing around 2000 colour images of nearly all the products made at the Belfast factory.

Marketing gimmicks
The objective of Spot-On was similar to that of Dinky and Corgi – to make true-to-life models that also served as toys. The goal was that models be detailed but robust – and Spot-On models were well-made and heavy. As Dinky and Corgi were already established, Spot-On found it difficult to establish a marketing gimmick. Spot-On tried first to establish itself in the British market, concentrating on a choice of model cars that were familiar in the United Kingdom (the first was a UK Ford Zodiac). Even the brand name was more easily understood in the UK. In the United States, where Dinky and Corgi sold a large number of toys, Spot-On Models were practically nonexistent, the name was not well understood, and the non-US British line-up was unfamiliar. This, together with their larger size and smaller production numbers, made Spot-On models more expensive than the competition. Consequently, they made a relatively small impact on the toy car market. Backed by the Lines Brothers empire, however, the product range did not need to make an immediate profit to survive.

Dinky and Corgi were both a little loose with their scale – typically around 1:48 for cars, but Spot-On decided always to be exactly "spot-on" in 1:42, because models were built to fit into "Cotswold" village style playsets. The company then proceeded to adopt this same scale for buses and commercial vehicles which made these models larger than most Dinky and Corgi counterparts. For example, the 12 wheel A.E.C. Mammoth Major petrol lorry lived up to its name in toy form and was massive compared to toy lorries from other manufacturers that often were pared down to a more manageable 1:50 or 1:64 scale.

Although more conservative than Corgi Toys, Spot-On had several innovations. The Volvo 122 "Amazon" had a sliding sunroof as did the Ford Consul sedan. On some models detailed interiors were featured with appropriately dressed drivers and passengers. For example, the "Tonibell" ice cream van had a moving worker inside the serving area and some models were banks with coin slots in the roof. The Ford Zodiac was made to appear as a 'press' car. Also, enhancing the "Spot-On" name, several cars were redesigned to incorporate battery powered working headlights (these cars had no interiors).  As seen below, the line-up was particularly British and often focused on British cars not always popular internationally.

Model selections
Both large and small cars were chosen for inclusion in the range to fully accentuate the fixed 1:42 scale. Rolls-Royces were represented initially by the Silver Wraith and, later, by the even larger Phantom V which featured working lights and members of the Royal Family as passengers. Smaller vehicles included the Isetta bubble car, the rare Meadows Frisky, the Fiat 500 and the Goggomobil. Also added were exotic sports cars such as the Aston Martin DB Mark III, Jensen 541, Daimler Dart SP250, and Bristol 406, along with more mundane models such as the Hillman Minx and Austin A40. The pattern for the A40 and several other Spot-on models were made by Haydn Bartlett of Space Models in the early sixties.

Cars were not the only offerings – a variety of interesting lorries were brought out as well. An Austin Prime-Mover flatbed, AEC Major and Mammoth, an ERF dropside lorry, a Bedford articulated tanker, Commer delivery van and Tonibell ice-cream truck were just a few. Even the UK-made Massey Ferguson type 65 tractor appeared, though for only one year making it worth several hundred dollars today in mint condition.

Details and packaging
Early Spot-On models stated "Made in the United Kingdom" on the base, but later models, like the MG PB Midget altered that to "Made in Northern Ireland". Most had solid colour paint jobs, simple silver metal wheel hubs and rubber tyres. Usually, lights were painted on the bodies in silver (except on the models with working lights). Similar to a few other earlier diecast makers, joints between bonnets and doors and other body panels were represented on Spot-On Models as raised ridges instead of indentations. Later Spot-On models had a few more lively wheel styles and tyres were sometimes a harder plastic. Whereas early models had metal bases, later ones were often black plastic.

The earliest packaging for typical Spot-On models was a box in light blue with a draughting compass 'dividers' and 'graph paper'-like grid overprinted with the typical yellow and black lettering. The feel of the graphics was that of not simply being toys, rather finely engineered pieces. The second series of boxes was similar but the 'dividers' were greatly reduced and an illustration of the car (absent on the first boxes) was added. The last boxes in the late 1960s were black and blue with cellophane window – and were possibly some of the earliest window boxes offered by any brand. Gift sets, usually of two vehicles in a diorama, featured the company's own character "Tommy Spot".  He appeared with a variety of friends as family man, policeman, mechanic, sailor, fireman, and even as a member of the Royal family.
Some of the rarest Spot-On models today command high prices among serious collectors. Spot-On models were supplied with number plates in transfer form on virtually all of its range and these were prone to cracking and flaking as the years advanced, also the adhesion technique and brittle paintwork formula all contributed towards paint-flaking and wear from box-rubbing as the years passed. As such, complete, unchipped models with all accessories, paperwork and undamaged boxes are rare, for example the 1964 Wadham Ambulance with patient on stretcher and 1966 Jaguar 3.4 with roof 'police' sign (undamaged) command very high prices in A1 condition as does the Tourist Caravan of 1962 and highly prized Routemaster Bus of 1963. All commercial Spot-On vehicles are today highly collectible and commonly command prices of US$100 to $200.

The Ford Zodiac of 1959, though Spot-On's first model, is widely available even though it is one of the oldest of the series. Many Zodiacs survive with their boxes intact. There still exist, however, rare colour combinations such as salmon pink over grey, pale lemon, and the slightly more garish bright pink. This was one of the first models Spot-On offered with or without working lights. Despite the model's ubiquity, it is rare to find one now with all of its original battery box, bulbs, and switches in full working order – not surprising considering the model now being at least 50 years old!

Colours and other variations
As time has passed, rare colour variations are now a specific collecting interest within the Spot-On collecting fraternity, which arguably makes Spot-on collecting more interesting than the acquisition of Dinky or Corgi. The latter are historically clear cut with virtually all rarities accounted for, but with Spot-On something regularly turns up that all Spot-On experts have never seen or heard about. Recently (April 2013) a hyper rare boxed metallic blue Renault Floride No. 166 appeared at auction and sold for £1400.

Spot-On's marketing was not always well planned. Apparently, production of some gift sets was done "on the fly" and made up nearly in a whim.  A good example of this are the Set702 variations. At least 4 are known to exist but there was also a Set703. Another area of interest is the subject of models that might have been. In the early catalogues and leaflets, for example, a 109/2B ERF truck with brick load is shown diagram and all, but it was never produced.

Acquisition of Dinky
In 1964, Lines Bros. acquired Meccano, the parent company of Dinky Toys and, rather than support two brands simultaneously, the owners decided to discontinue Spot-On in favour of Dinky in 1967. Some production continued in New Zealand and a range of American cars was planned for production in Hong Kong for export to the United States, but these were eventually relabelled as the Dinky Toys "57" series. They did, however, retain the trademark Spot-On 1:42 scale.

From this point on, Dinkys were usually made in 1:42 scale, though unlike Spot-On they were not consistent and continued to make both larger and smaller models to fit in with different market niches. Spot-On's doll house furniture line was made at 1:16 scale.

Destined to fail
Though model choices were unique and often brilliant (who else made a Bristol or the early Jensen?), Spot-On as a diecast brand was destined to fail precisely because of its endearing qualities.[Subjective statement requiring some form of serious validation].  Models were more expensive than the competition and more conservative. Each Spot-On model was painted in at least 8, and often 16 different colours, which was attractive to the buyer (and today's collector), but an inefficient production practice. Appeal was limited for an expensive line of almost exclusively British vehicles in an increasingly global market. While American children may have been enamored of certain MGs, Jaguars and Rolls-Royces, they probably had never heard of Jensens, Bristols, Armstrong Siddeleys, or Meadows. Meanwhile, Matchbox, Corgi, and Dinky always had a few American and other European cars in their line-ups. Perhaps it is fortunate Spot-On ceased production just as Mattel Hot Wheels were introduced as the innovation of the thin low friction axle put many more successful toy manufacturers out of business.

Unfortunately, many Spot-On models had artificial chrome attachments that have tended to not last as well as Dinky Toys parts of the era. However, there is a market in replacement parts, and some commercial enterprises undertake full restoration of Spot-On models. Today, Spot-On models are as collectible as Dinky Toys and Corgi Toys, generally commanding even higher prices. The Morris Minor 1000, Jensen 541, Bristol 406, and Meadows Frisky are particular favourites of collectors because they were not produced in either Corgi or Dinky ranges.

Revival
In 2008, the French company Norev reintroduced the Spot-On brand once made by Tri-Ang, apparently using the original tooling. Ironically, the original Spot-On Renault Floride (No 166) was the only French marque originally offered, but nevertheless, Spot-On models are once again being produced, in authentic original style packaging. These commonly sell on eBay for about US$80 to $100 a piece.

In addition, some contemporary modellers have closely copied Spot-On models. For example, one maker, English Replicars, in white metal, appears to have copied at least one Spot-On model sometime in the 1990s. The car was the Morris Minor, duplicated down to details and even the rather different 1:42 scale.

References
 
 
 
 

Footnotes

Toy cars and trucks
1:43 scale models
Lines Bros
Toy companies of the United Kingdom
Die-cast toys
Goods manufactured in Northern Ireland
Products introduced in 1959
1959 establishments in Northern Ireland
History of Belfast
Economy of Belfast